Bolzano is the capital city of South Tyrol, Italy.

Bolzano may also refer to:
Bernard Bolzano (1781–1848), German-speaking mathematician
Bolzano Bellunese, a hamlet of Belluno, in Veneto, Italy
Bolzano Novarese, a commune in the Province of Novara, Italy
Bolzano Vicentino, a commune in the Province of Vicenza, Italy
Italian cruiser Bolzano, World War II-era Trento-class heavy cruiser

See also
 Urbano Bolzanio, (1442–1524), Italian humanist